In enzymology, a carboxymethylenebutenolidase (also known as CMBL and dienelactone hydrolase) is an enzyme that catalyzes the chemical reaction

4-carboxymethylenebut-2-en-4-olide + H2O  4-oxohex-2-enedioate

Thus, the two substrates of this enzyme are 4-carboxymethylenebut-2-en-4-olide and H2O, whereas its product is 4-oxohex-2-enedioate.

This enzyme belongs to the family of hydrolases, specifically those acting on carboxylic ester bonds.  The systematic name of this enzyme class is 4-carboxymethylenebut-2-en-4-olide lactonohydrolase. Other names in common use include maleylacetate enol-lactonase, dienelactone hydrolase, and carboxymethylene butenolide hydrolase.  This enzyme participates in gamma-hexachlorocyclohexane degradation and 1,4-dichlorobenzene degradation.

Structural studies

References

 

EC 3.1.1
Enzymes of known structure